The OFC–UEFA play-off of the 1992 Olympic Football Tournament qualification competition was a two-legged tie that decided one spot in the 1992 Olympic football tournament in Spain. The play-off was contested by the winners from the OFC, Australia, and the fourth-ranked team from UEFA, the Netherlands.

The first leg in Sydney finished as a 1–1 draw, while the second leg in Utrecht finished as a 2–2 draw after extra time. Though level 3–3 on aggregate, Australia won on away goals and qualified for the 1992 Summer Olympics.

Qualified teams

Summary
|}

Matches

3–3 on aggregate. Australia won on away goals and qualified for the 1992 Summer Olympics.

Goalscorers

References

External links
 First leg report on 11v11.com
 Second leg report on 11v11.com
 Australia Under 23 National Team – 1992 Match Results at OZFootball.net

Play-off
May 1992 sports events in Australia
May 1992 sports events in Europe
1991–92 in OFC football
1991–92 in European football
1992 in Australian soccer
1991–92 in Dutch football
2000s in Sydney
Soccer in Sydney
Sports competitions in Sydney
Sports competitions in Utrecht (city)
International association football competitions hosted by Australia
International association football competitions hosted by the Netherlands